The Hipódromo Argentino de Palermo is a horse racing course located in Buenos Aires, Argentina, and one of the most important in the country, hosting 120 days of racing and 1,400 races every year. Races are hosted three days a week, with about nine races per racing day. The property is open to the public free of charge twenty-four hours a day.

Its dirt course is considered one of the best in the world, and the track is one of the most modern in South America.

The Hipódromo Argentino de Palermo also hosts music concerts, attracting twenty to twenty-five thousand attendants, and culinary fairs, attracting ten to twenty thousand attendants. Musicians that have played include Alejandro Sanz, Fito Paez, Lisandro Aristimuño, Divididos, David Bisbal, Katy Perry, Maroon 5, Måneskin and TINI. These events are hosted in the hippodrome park, in the middle of the track. Adidas also hosts running training events at the park.

History 
The Hipódromo de Palermo was first opened on May 7, 1876, as one of the first racecourses in the city of Buenos Aires. On its inauguration, the trains and streetcars of Buenos Aires were not enough to transport the large number of people who wanted to attend the event. Despite this, close to 10,000 people witnessed the first race ever disputed at the Hipódromo, won by the horse Resbaloso. The grandstand was designed by Néstor París and could seat 1,600 people. 

The Argentine Jockey Club, formed in 1881, began to administrate the racecourse in 1884.

The Gran Premio Nacional (Argentine Derby), now the most important race run at the course, was first run in 1885, won by Souvenir.

Tattersalls de Palermo, an equine sales floor, was opened in 1898.

The first automobile race in Argentina was run at the Hipódromo de Palermo in 1901.

In 1908, the original buildings and grandstands were replaced with a Beaux Arts grandstand designed by Louis Faure-Dujarric, still in use today and considered part of the city's architectural heritage.

Photo finishes, using Photochart, were introduced in 1947.

The racecourse has been known by its current name of Hipódromo Argentino de Palermo since 1953. Prior to that, it was known as Hipódromo de Palermo.

Night racing started in 1971, with the installation of an electrical lighting system on a racetrack. Seven hundred and fifty additional lights were added in 1992.

Female jockeys have been allowed to ride at the track since the 1970's.

On August 5, 1992, the racecourse was privatized and ownership given to Hipódromo Argentino de Palermo Sociedad Anónima (HAPSA), in an agreement originally set to last until 2027 and later extended to 2032.

In 2001, the city of Buenos Aires declared the racecourse of cultural interest of the city.

Facilities 
The racetrack occupies an area of 60 hectares.

There are 1,473 stalls available for horses in training, including 1,231 permanently available for horses based at the track and 142 for horses coming from other locations. 

The course itself consists of three courses, made of eighty percent sand, fourteen percent limestone, and six percent clay, with a special natural drainage system that allows for normal racing to continue on rainy days. Up to 21 horses can run in a race at a time. A turf course was added in 2011.

The racecourse has two slot rooms containing a total of over one thousand slot machines and a restaurant. HAPSA has the authority to open up to four thousand five hundred slot machines.

Important Races 
Group I Races

 Gran Premio Ciudad de Buenos Aires
 Gran Premio Criadores
 Gran Premio Criadores
 Gran Premio Criadores
 Gran Premio General San Martín
 Gran Premio Gilberto Lerena
 Gran Premio Gilberto Lerena
 Gran Premio Jorge de Atucha
 Gran Premio Maipú
 Gran Premio Montevideo
 Gran Premio Nacional
 Gran Premio Polla de Potrillos
 Gran Premio República Argentina
 Gran Premio Selección

Group II Races

 Gran Premio Apertura
 Gran Premio Arturo R. y A. Bullrich
 Gran Premio Benito Villanueva
 Gran Premio Carlos Tomkinson
 Gran Premio Chacabuco
 Gran Premio Chile
 Gran Premio Comparación
 Gran Premio Eduardo Casey
 Gran Premio Francisco J. Beazley
 Gran Premio General Belgrano
 Gran Premio General Luis María Campos
 Gran Premio Ignacio e I. F. Correas
 Gran Premio Miguel A. y T. Juárez Celman
 Gran Premio Miguel Cané
 Gran Premio Otoño
 Gran Premio Perú
 Gran Premio Ramón Biaus
 Gran Premio Santiago Luro
 Gran Premio Saturnino J. Unzué
 Gran Premio Venezuela
 Gran Premio Vicente L. Casares

Group III Races

 Gran Premio Asociación Propietarios de Caballos de Carrera
 Gran Premio Ayacucho
 Gran Premio Buenos Aires
 Gran Premio Carlos Casares
 Gran Premio Círculo Propietarios de Caballerizas de SPC
 Gran Premio Coronel Miguel F. Martínez
 Gran Premio Coronel Pringles
 Gran Premio Estados Unidos de América
 Gran Premio General Dirtles
 Gran Premio General Francisco B. Bosch
 Gran Premio General Güemes
 Gran Premio General Lavalle
 Gran Premio Guillermo Kemmis
 Gran Premio Inés Victorica Roca
 Gran Premio Irlanda
 Gran Premio Italia
 Gran Premio Lotería de la Ciudad de Buenos Aires
 Gran Premio Manuel J. Guiraldes
 Gran Premio México
 Gran Premio Old Man
 Gran Premio Paraguay
 Gran Premio Pedro E. y Manuel A. Crespo
 Gran Premio República de Panamá
 Gran Premio República Federativa de Brasil
 Gran Premio República Oriental del Uruguay
 Gran Premio Ricardo P. Sauze

References

External links 

Horse racing venues in Argentina
Sports venues in Buenos Aires
1876 establishments in Argentina
Buildings and structures completed in 1908